Outside the Simian Flock is the 2001 debut album by Belgian rock band Millionaire. It was released in Belgium by Play It Again Sam.

Track listing

Chart positions

References

2001 debut albums
Millionaire (band) albums